Charles-Antoine Kouakou (born 14 July 1998) is Paralympic athlete from France. He competed at the Tokyo Paralympic Games in athletics, 400 m - T20 (for athletes with intellectual impairment). He won the gold medal for the 400m -T2 on 31 August 2021.

He previously competed in the INAS Summer Games in 2018.

He is chevalier of the Legion of Honour

References

External links
 
 

Living people
1998 births
Athletes from Paris
Paralympic athletes of France
French male sprinters
Athletes (track and field) at the 2020 Summer Paralympics
Medalists at the 2020 Summer Paralympics
Paralympic gold medalists for France
Paralympic medalists in athletics (track and field)
Medalists at the World Para Athletics European Championships
20th-century French people
21st-century French people